JSX (originally known as JetSuiteX) is an American air carrier in the United States and Mexico that describes itself as a "hop-on jet service" which operates point-to-point flights between and within Arizona, California, Colorado, Florida, Nevada, New Mexico, New York, and Texas in the United States and Baja California Sur in Mexico. The air carrier sells its flights as public air charters under 14 CFR Part 380 and flights are operated by its subsidiary Delux Public Charter (as JSX Air) under 14 CFR Part 135.

JSX operates Embraer ERJ-135 and ERJ-145 aircraft, each retrofitted with 30 seats, removed overhead bins, and in-row power.

History
The airline was originally founded as JetSuiteX in April 2016. According to chief executive officer (CEO) Alex Wilcox, the air carrier was created in response to declining short-haul traffic and the rise in fares on short-haul flights in the United States. Wilcox attributes these phenomena in part to long wait times in airports.

The company started operations on April 19, 2016, with its first flight between Burbank and Concord, both in California.

On August 8, 2019, JetSuiteX re-branded to JSX.

In September 2020, Orange County Board of Supervisors notified JSX that the airline would be barred from operating flights to John Wayne Airport in Orange County, California, starting January 1, 2021. Wilcox publicly addressed the situation through emails and social media, and a customer outreach program invited fliers to voice support for the carrier to continue its flights to Orange County. On December 14, 2020, JSX filed a lawsuit against the airport, stating that it has “refused to offer any accommodations” to the carrier and that the airport “discriminatorily chose" the termination "in favor of two large airlines [Allegiant and Spirit Airlines]." The first of the two operates the same routes from SNA as JSX. On December 23, 2020, the airline was granted a temporary restraining order against SNA, preventing the airport officials from terminating the airline's operations on the planned date of January 1, 2021. A spokeswoman told a news outlet that the airport will comply with the order. JSX continues to operate from the airport.

Corporate affairs
JetBlue and Qatar Airways are minority shareholders in JSX. CEO Alex Wilcox was a founding executive of both JetBlue and Kingfisher Airlines.

Destinations
JSX serves or has previously served the following destinations :

Codeshare agreements
JSX does not participate in any major global airline alliances, but holds a codeshare agreement with JetBlue, which includes JetBlue's TrueBlue loyalty program. 

It is possible also for passengers to enter United Airlines MileagePlus numbers to earn miles on JSX.

Since all flights operate from private FBO terminals, there are no ticketing or baggage agreements at any location.

Fleet

The JSX fleet comprises the following aircraft:

Services
JSX flights depart from private jet terminals separate from the passenger terminals used by Part 121 and some Part 135 airlines, commonly referred to as FBOs. In most locations, the facility is operated by JSX, while in some, JSX utilizes existing facilities managed by other companies. JSX utilizes the TSA Secure Flight program and additional passive security measures, including explosive and weapons detection.

References

External links 

 

Regional airlines of the United States
Airlines established in 2016
Companies based in Dallas
Airlines based in Texas
2016 establishments in Texas